Tim Young (born 11 August 1956) is an Australian rower. He competed in the men's eight event at the 1980 Summer Olympics.

References

External links
 

1956 births
Living people
Australian male rowers
Olympic rowers of Australia
Rowers at the 1980 Summer Olympics
Place of birth missing (living people)
20th-century Australian people